Dalian Chanjoy Football Club is a professional Chinese football club. The team is based in Dalian, Liaoning.

History
Dalian Boyang F.C. was established on 20 August 2015, by Dalian Boyoung Construction Engineering Co., Ltd.. They bought the first team of Dalian Longjuanfeng and played in the 2016 China Amateur Football League, and ended up winning the entire championship by beating Shaanxi Chang'an Athletic in the penalty shoot-out in the final and won promotion to 2017 China League Two. The club changed their English name as Dalian Boyoung in the 2017 season, and Dalian Chanjoy in the 2019 season.

Name history
 2015–2016 Dalian Boyang F.C. 大连博阳
 2017–2018 Dalian Boyoung F.C. 大连博阳
 2019      Dalian Chanjoy F.C. 大连千兆

Managerial history
  Chen Bo (2016–2017)
  Jiang Feng (2017–2018)
  Dželaludin Muharemović (2019)
  Zhao Faqing (2019)

Results
All-time league rankings

As of the end of 2019 season.

 In group stage.

Key
 Pld = Played
 W = Games won
 D = Games drawn
 L = Games lost
 F = Goals for
 A = Goals against
 Pts = Points
 Pos = Final position

 DNQ = Did not qualify
 DNE = Did not enter
 NH = Not Held
 – = Does Not Exist
 R1 = Round 1
 R2 = Round 2
 R3 = Round 3
 R4 = Round 4

 F = Final
 SF = Semi-finals
 QF = Quarter-finals
 R16 = Round of 16
 Group = Group stage
 GS2 = Second Group stage
 QR1 = First Qualifying Round
 QR2 = Second Qualifying Round
 QR3 = Third Qualifying Round

Honours
China Amateur Football League: 2016

References

Defunct football clubs in China
Football clubs in China
Association football clubs established in 2015
Sport in Dalian
2015 establishments in China
Football clubs in Liaoning
2020 disestablishments in China
Association football clubs disestablished in 2020